The 1970 Paris Open Indoor Championships was a men's Grand Prix tennis tournament played on indoor carpet courts. It was the 2nd edition of the Paris Open (later known as the Paris Masters). It took place at the Palais omnisports de Paris-Bercy in Paris, France, and ran from 9 November through 15 November 1970.

The singles event was won by third-seeded Arthur Ashe.

Finals

Singles

 Arthur Ashe defeated  Marty Riessen 7–6, 6–4, 6–3
 It was Ashe's 5th title of the year and the 7th of his career.

Doubles
 Pancho Gonzales /  Ken Rosewall defeated  Tom Okker /  Marty Riessen 6–4, 7–6, 7–6

References

External links 
 ATP tournament profile
 ITF tournament edition details